Acacia convallium is a tree of the genus Acacia and the subgenus Plurinerves that is endemic to northern Australia.

Description
It has terete branchlets that have a felty covering of short hairs. Like most species of Acacia it has phyllodes rather than true leaves. It blooms between April and May producing inflorescences in groups of four to six with spherical flower-heads containing about 30 creamy to golden yellow coloured flowers.

Taxonomy
The species was first formally described by the botanist Leslie Pedley in 1999 as part of the work Notes on Acacia (Leguminosae: Mimosoideae) chiefly from northern Australia as published in the journal Austrobaileya. Pedley reclassified it as Racosperma convallium in 2003 but it was transferred back to genus Acacia in 2006.

Distribution
It is restricted to a small area in the top end of the Northern Territory along the Coburg Peninsula and the upper catchments of the Alligator and Liverpool Rivers where it is commonly situated in gorges or sandstone escarpments growing in skeletal sandy or deep sandy soils.

See also
 List of Acacia species

References

convallium
Flora of the Northern Territory
Plants described in 1999
Taxa named by Leslie Pedley